Afford is an English surname. Notable people with the surname include:

Andy Afford (born 1964), English cricketer
Malcolm Afford (1906–1954), Australian playwright and writer
Thelma Afford (1908–1996), Australian costume designer, actress and journalist

English-language surnames